The Democracy and Progress Party (DEVA) is a Turkish political party founded on 9 March 2020 under the leadership of Ali Babacan, a former economy minister under the AKP. The official abbreviation is "DEVA" (Remedy in Turkish) according to the party records. The party's logo is a water droplet, inside a silhouette of sapling.

History

DEVA Party is a political party in Turkey formed by former Economy Minister & Deputy Prime Minister Ali Babacan as the result of a split from Recep Tayyip Erdoğan's Justice and Development Party. The party is currently being represented by one seat at the Grand National Assembly, with MP Mustafa Yeneroğlu being one of her founders.

The founders of the party also include former Minister of Justice Sadullah Ergin, former Minister of Science, Industry, and Technology, Nihat Ergün and former Minister of State Selma Aliye Kavaf, who all served in Erdoğan cabinets for many years; and the former Balıkesir mayor Ahmet Edip Uğur from the Justice and Development Party as well.

Babacan was unanimously elected as the Chairperson at the Founders' Meeting on 10 March 2020. He announced the official logo and agenda of the party on 11 March 2020, during the first conference of the party.

Despite his history in the AKP, Ali Babacan has adopted a secular stance in his politics in DEVA Party, emphasizing personal freedoms instead of a religious conservatism. He has criticized evolution being removed from the Biology curriculum for high school and lower education. He has also expressed his opposition against religious studies lessons being mandatory for school children, saying parents should be able to opt out of them. He has also expressed his opposition about ban on tariqas. He said; "When the government 'bans' them, they still continue their activities off the record and without any supervision. We are always in favor of freedom and transparency. Congregations and tariqas are a centuries-old tradition of these lands. You cannot destroy centuries-old tradition with a prohibitionist mentality.".

The Democracy and Progress Party has announced 22 Action Plans that will bring government reforms for the problems that the country has been facing in the recent years, addressing many different topics ranging from economy and finance policies, to entrepreneurship, to the justice system, to social problems. These plans include 90-day and 360-day goals.

Party leaders

See also 
 List of political parties in Turkey

References

External links
 Official website

Liberal conservative parties in Turkey
Liberal parties in Turkey
Political parties in Turkey
Political parties established in 2020
2020 establishments in Turkey